Atoma is the eleventh full-length studio album by Swedish melodic death metal band Dark Tranquillity. It was released on 4 November 2016 through Century Media Records. Atoma is the band's first studio album with new bassist Anders Iwers, who replaced founding member Martin Henriksson (also the rhythm guitarist), after Henriksson left the band in early 2016 due to loss of passion for playing music. Atoma is the last release to feature founding lead guitarist Niklas Sundin, who would depart from the band in March 2020.

Two songs, "The Absolute" and "Time Out of Place", were recorded during the making of this album, but were released on a bonus disc in the limited edition. These songs are softer, darker and more brooding with only clean singing, reminiscent of bands such as Katatonia and the later Opeth. Another song, "Reconstruction Time Again", was released as a Japanese edition bonus track. It is a nine-minute electro-industrial medley of the songs "State of Trust", "None Becoming", and "Uniformity" from the Construct album.

Track listing

Personnel

Dark Tranquillity
Mikael Stanne – vocals
Niklas Sundin – guitars
Anders Iwers – bass 
Martin Brändström – keyboards
Anders Jivarp – drums

Additional personnel
David Castillo – mixing, mastering
Annelie Johansson – backing vocals (track 3)
Björn Gelotte – lead guitar (track 5)
Niklas Sundin – album artwork

Charts

References

2016 albums
Century Media Records albums
Dark Tranquillity albums